Pseudomogrus improcerus is a jumping spider species in the genus Pseudomogrus that lives in Yemen. The female was first described in 1994. The species was previously known as Yllenus improcerus, but was renamed Logunyllus improcerus in 2016 and was subsequently moved to the genus Pseudomogrus in 2019.

References

Salticidae
Spiders of Asia
Spiders described in 1994
Taxa named by Wanda Wesołowska